The 2001 Air Canada Cup was Canada's 23rd annual national midget 'AAA' hockey championship, played April 23–29, 2001 at the Prince George Multiplex in Prince George, British Columbia.  Steve Bernier scored the winning goal in the second overtime period of the gold medal game to give the Gouverneurs de Ste-Foy a 4-3 victory over the Calgary Royals. It was Ste-Foy's third national title in eight appearances in the final.

Teams

Round robin

Standings

Scores

Ste-Foy 4 - Toronto 3
Calgary 6 - Dartmouth 4
Prince George 6 - Beardy's 4
Dartmouth 3 - Ste-Foy 2 (OT)
Toronto 3 - Beardy's 2
Calgary 7 - Prince George 2
Toronto 6 - Calgary 4
Ste-Foy 6 - Beardy's 2
Dartmouth 5 - Prince George 2
Dartmouth 7 - Toronto 5
Calgary 5 - Beardy's 4 (OT)
Ste-Foy 6 - Price George 2
Beardy's 6 - Dartmouth 6
Calgary 5 - Ste-Foy 2
Toronto 2 - Prince George 1

Playoffs

Semi-finals
Calgary 6 - Toronto 0
Ste-Foy 10 - Dartmouth 1

Bronze-medal game
Toronto 4 - Dartmouth 3 (OT)

Gold-medal game
Ste-Foy 4 - Calgary 3 (2OT)

Individual awards
Most Valuable Player: Steve Bernier (Ste-Foy)
Top Scorer: Andrew Joudrey (Dartmouth)
Top Forward: Brett Pilkington (Calgary)
Top Defenceman: Justin Cruse (Beardy's)
Top Goaltender: Mike Charlton (Dartmouth)
Most Sportsmanlike Player: Robert Cranston (Toronto)

Regional Playdowns

Atlantic Region 
The Dartmouth Subways advanced by winning their regional tournament, which was played April 4–8, 2001 in Miramichi, New Brunswick.

Quebec 
The Gouverneurs du Ste-Foy advanced by capturing the Quebec Midget AAA League title.

Central Region 
The Toronto Young Nationals advanced by winning their regional tournament, which was played April 3–8, 2001 in Kitchener, Ontario.

West Region 
The Beady's Blackhawks advanced by winning their regional tournament, which was played April 4–8, 2001 in Moose Jaw, Saskatchewan.

Pacific Region 
The Prince George Cougars won their regional tournament, which was played April 4–8, 2001 in Alberta, but qualified for the national championship as the host team.  As a result, the Calgary Royals also advanced by finishing second.

See also
Telus Cup

References

External links
2001 Air Canada Cup Home Page
Hockey Canada-Telus Cup Guide and Record Book

Telus Cup
Air Canada Cup
Sport in Prince George, British Columbia
April 2001 sports events in Canada
Ice hockey competitions in British Columbia